Bezrechnaya-2 (also given variously as Bezrechnaya,  Bezrechnoy, Khodabulak, Khada Bulak North, or Mirnaya) was an interceptor aircraft base in Chita Oblast, Russia. It featured a linear ramp.

The base has been home to:
 22 IAP (22nd Fighter Aviation Regiment) flying Sukhoi Su-15TM aircraft from 1971 to 1992.  The regiment was subordinate to 50th Guards Air Defence Corps of the 14th Air Defence Army from 1988 to 1992.
 OSAZ (unidentified) (Independent Composite Aviation Regiment) flying Su-15TM.  This may be an erroneous identification of 22 IAP listed above.

References

Soviet Air Force bases
Soviet Frontal Aviation
Soviet Air Defence Force bases
Russian Air Force bases